Mark Kenny Carroll (November 19, 1896 – January 12, 1985) was an American prelate of the Roman Catholic Church. He served as bishop of the Diocese of Wichita in Kansas from 1947 to 1967.

Biography

Early life 
One of twelve children, Mark Carroll was born on November 19, 1896, in St. Louis, Missouri, to Thomas and Mary (née Kenny) Carroll. His father was a police officer. After attending St. Louis Preparatory Seminary in St. Louis, he studied at Kenrick Seminary in Webster Groves, Missouri, from 1916 to 1922.

Priesthood 
Carroll was ordained to the priesthood for the Archdiocese of St. Louis on June 10, 1922. He then served as a curate at Immaculate Conception Parish in Maplewood, Missouri, and at St. Rose's Parish in St. Louis. He was named director of the Society for the Propagation of the Faith and the Association of the Holy Childhood in 1924, and vice-chancellor of the archdiocese in 1929. He later served as rector of the cathedral school (1931–1946) and director of Calvary Cemetery in St. Louis (1937–1947).  Carroll was raised to the rank of papal chamberlain (1937) and domestic prelate (1943). He served as pastor of the Old Cathedral Parish from 1937 until 1942, when he was transferred to St. Margaret's Parish in St. Louis.

Bishop of Wichita 
On February 15, 1947, Carroll was appointed the fourth bishop of the Diocese of Wichita by Pope Pius XII. He received his episcopal consecration on April 23, 1947. from Archbishop Joseph Ritter, with Archbishop Paul Schulte and Bishop George Donnelly serving as co-consecrators. He was installed at Wichita on May 6, 1947. 

In 1948, Carroll called for the repeal of the state prohibition law against alcohol sales because it was "an unwarrantable infringement" on "reasonable liberty." In 1951 he became first Catholic clergyman in the United States to receive the National Conference of Christians and Jews citation for "promoting amity and understanding among all elements of our pluralistic society." Carroll attended all four sessions of the Second Vatican Council in Rome between 1962 and 1965, and became an outspoken proponent of ecumenism and of the use of vernacular in the Mass. He also supported the American Civil Rights Movement, and his self-confessed mission was "to preach equality of man and dignity and worth."

Carroll relinquished the active administration of the diocese in 1963.

Retirement and legacy 
On September 27, 1967, Pope Paul VI accepted Carroll's resignation as bishop of Wichita and appointed him Titular Bishop of Taparura. Carroll resigned his titular see on January 16, 1976. 

Mark Carroll died from cancer at St. Joseph Medical Center in Wichita on January 12, 1985, at age 88.Bishop Carroll Catholic High School in Wichita is named in his honor.

References

1896 births
1985 deaths
Kenrick–Glennon Seminary alumni
Roman Catholic Archdiocese of St. Louis
Clergy from St. Louis
Participants in the Second Vatican Council
Roman Catholic bishops of Wichita
20th-century Roman Catholic bishops in the United States
Religious leaders from Missouri